Aaron Lee Brooks (born April 27, 1990) is an American professional baseball pitcher in the San Diego Padres organization. He has previously played in Major League Baseball (MLB) for the Kansas City Royals, Oakland Athletics, Baltimore Orioles, and St. Louis Cardinals, and in the KBO League for the Kia Tigers.

Early years
Brooks attended Cajon High School in San Bernardino, California, and California State University, San Bernardino, where he played college baseball for the Cal State San Bernardino Coyotes.

Professional career

Kansas City Royals
The Kansas City Royals selected Brooks in the ninth round of the 2011 MLB draft. Through the 2013 season, Brooks had issued only 1.3 walks per nine innings pitched in  total innings. The Royals invited Brooks to spring training in 2014. They assigned him to the Omaha Storm Chasers of the Class AAA Pacific Coast League (PCL) at the start of the 2014 season. Before he could pitch for Omaha, the Royals promoted Brooks to the major leagues on April 5, 2014. He was optioned back to Omaha on April 8 without appearing in a game. He made his MLB debut on May 3.

Oakland Athletics
On July 28, 2015, Brooks and teammate Sean Manaea were traded to the Oakland Athletics for Ben Zobrist. In his first game for the Athletics, he earned his first major league win.

Chicago Cubs
On February 25, 2016, Brooks was traded to the Chicago Cubs for outfielder Chris Coghlan. Due to a hip contusion, Brooks missed most of the 2016 season. When healthy, he pitched for the Iowa Cubs of the PCL. He was designated for assignment by the Cubs, never playing a single game for the team, on August 22, 2017.

Milwaukee Brewers
The next day, the Milwaukee Brewers claimed him off waivers. He pitched for the Colorado Springs Sky Sox of the PCL, and was promoted to the major leagues on August 30, 2018. The very next day, Brooks was designated for assignment by the Brewers, without appearing in a game, in order to make room on the roster for the team's acquisitions of Curtis Granderson and Gio González.

Oakland Athletics (Second stint)
On September 3, 2018, he was acquired by the Athletics for cash considerations, his second stint with the organization. Brooks entered Spring training of 2019 competing for a rotation spot. He won the fifth spot in the rotation after numerous injuries sustained to other starters. On July 3, Brooks was designated for assignment.

Baltimore Orioles
On July 6, 2019, Brooks was claimed off waivers by the Baltimore Orioles. After finishing the season with the Orioles, he was released to pursue an opportunity in Korea on November 12, 2019.

Kia Tigers
On November 14, 2019, Brooks signed with the Kia Tigers of the KBO League. In 23 starts for Kia in 2020, Brooks pitched to an 11–4 record and 2.50 ERA with 130 strikeouts. On November 19, 2020, Brooks re-signed with the Tigers for the 2021 season, on a $1MM deal with a $200K signing bonus. Brooks worked to a 3.35 ERA in 13 starts for the Tigers in 2021. He was released by the team on August 9, 2021, after traces of marijuana were found in a vape pen he had ordered online.

St. Louis Cardinals
On January 31, 2022, Brooks signed a minor league contract with the St. Louis Cardinals.  On March 25, the Cardinals selected Brooks’ contract and added him to the 40-man and Opening Day rosters. He appeared in 5 games for the Cardinals, but struggled to a 7.71 ERA, striking out 7 in 9.1 innings pitched.

On May 2, Brooks was designated for assignment by St. Louis when active rosters were reduced from 28 to 26. On May 5, he cleared waivers and was sent outright to the Triple-A Memphis Redbirds. He spent the remainder of the campaign in Memphis, logging a 5–4 record and 5.56 ERA with 54 strikeouts in 69.2 innings of work. On October 17, Brooks was released by the Cardinals organization.

San Diego Padres
On December 15, 2022, Brooks signed a minor league contract with the San Diego Padres.

References

External links

1990 births
Living people
Sportspeople from San Bernardino, California
Baseball players from California
Major League Baseball pitchers
American expatriate baseball players in South Korea
Kansas City Royals players
Oakland Athletics players
Baltimore Orioles players
Kia Tigers players
St. Louis Cardinals players
Cal State San Bernardino Coyotes baseball players
Idaho Falls Chukars players
Kane County Cougars players
Wilmington Blue Rocks players
Northwest Arkansas Naturals players
Omaha Storm Chasers players
Nashville Sounds players
Iowa Cubs players
Colorado Springs Sky Sox players
American expatriate baseball players in the Dominican Republic
Tigres del Licey players